Allan Miloud Bernard Viral (born 3 December 2001) is a French footballer who plays as a midfielder for Fløy.

Career
Born in Paris, Viral joined the academy of Ipswich Town on a two-year scholarship in 2018.

Viral made his debut for Ipswich Town on 6 October 2020 in a 2–0 victory over Gillingham in the EFL Trophy.

In April 2021, Ipswich announced that Viral would be released at the end of the 2020–21 season following the end of his contract. In September he joined Norwegian third-tier club Fløy.

Career statistics

References

External links
 
 

2001 births
Living people
French footballers
Association football midfielders
Ipswich Town F.C. players
Flekkerøy IL players
French expatriate footballers
Expatriate footballers in England
French expatriate sportspeople in England
Expatriate footballers in Norway
French expatriate sportspeople in Norway